Let's Stay Together is the fourth album by the soul singer Al Green, released in 1972, and is the follow-up to his moderate success Al Green Gets Next to You. It was recorded at Royal Recording Studio, 1320 S. Lauderdale, in Memphis and was a success, peaking at number eight on the pop albums chart and became the first of six albums to peak at number-one on the soul album chart (where it claimed the position for ten weeks). It is best known for the title track "Let's Stay Together", which became Green's signature song and his only number-one pop hit single. The album was the third produced by Willie Mitchell and marked the beginning of Green's classic period of critically acclaimed albums. Let's Stay Together was reissued in 2003 by The Right Stuff.

Critical reaction

The album's appeal was widespread among critics. At the time, Rolling Stone noted "Green's voice is something to marvel at. He can croon, shout, scat, rise to the smoothest falsetto, and throw in the funkiest growls ... Let's Stay Together is, like its predecessor, an indispensable treat."

In 1999, Q magazine wrote that the album "shows him as the authentic voice of love's pain and purity on such wonders as 'How Can You Mend A Broken Heart?'" and that "[H]is cover of the Bee Gees' [song] took the soul ballad to new levels of artistry and refinement."

List rankings
Included in Q'' magazine's "Best Soul Albums of All Time"
Ranked #335 in the Virgin All-Time top 1000 album list
Ranked #608 in the Guinness top 1000 album poll (1994) and #25 in the Top 50 Soul Albums list

Track listing
All songs written by Al Green, except where noted

Side one
 "Let's Stay Together" (Green, Al Jackson, Jr., Willie Mitchell) – 3:18
 "La-La for You" (Green, Mitchell) – 3:31
 "So You're Leaving" – 2:57
 "What Is This Feeling" – 3:42
 "Old Time Lovin'" – 3:19

Side two
 "I've Never Found a Girl (Who Loves Me Like You Do)" (Eddie Floyd, Alvertis Isbell, Booker T. Jones) – 3:41
 "How Can You Mend a Broken Heart" (Barry Gibb, Robin Gibb) – 6:22
 "Judy" – 3:47
 "It Ain't No Fun to Me" – 3:23

Reissue tracks
Bonus tracks on 2003 reissue
 "Eli's Game" – 4:55
 "Listen to Me" (Traditional) – 2:30

Personnel
Rhythm section
 Howard Grimes – drums 
 Al Jackson Jr. – drums
 Leroy Hodges – bass guitar
 Charles Hodges – organ, piano
 Teenie Hodges – guitar

Horn section
 Wayne Jackson – trumpet
 Andrew Love – horn, tenor saxophone
 Ed Logan – horn, tenor saxophone
 James Mitchell – bass, baritone saxophone, arrangements
 Jack Hale, Sr. – trombone

Vocals
 Al Green – vocals
 Charles Chalmers, Donna Rhodes, Sandra Rhodes – background vocals, arrangements

Additional personnel
 Willie Mitchell – producer, engineer
 Willie Mitchell & Terry Manning – mixing engineers
 Peter Rynston – mastering engineer
 Jools DeVere – artwork
 Bud Lee – photography

See also
List of number-one R&B albums of 1972 (U.S.)

References

Bibliography

1972 albums
Al Green albums
Albums produced by Willie Mitchell (musician)
Hi Records albums